Yili Group (full name: Inner Mongolia Yili Industrial Group Company Limited) is a Chinese dairy products producer headquartered in Hohhot, Inner Mongolia. It is one of China's leading dairy companies alongside Mengniu, and is listed as an A share company on the Shanghai Stock Exchange (SSE). It is engaged in processing and manufacturing of milk products, including ice cream, milk tea powder, sterilized milk and fresh milk under "Yili" brand, powdered milk under "Pro-Kido" brand, and organic milk under "Satine" brand. In 2018, it is the world's third best-performing food brands. In 2021, Yili ranked 1st on FBIF's Top 100 Chinese Food & Beverage Companies list.

Its head office is in the Jinshan Development Zone (金山开发区) in Hohhot.

The company was an official sponsor of the 2008 Beijing Olympics and 2022 Winter Olympics.

History
In 1956, "the Cattle Breeding Team of Hohhot Huimin District" was established. In 1958, it was renamed as "the Cooperative Dairy Farm of Hohhot Huimin District", which is the predecessor of the Yili Group.
In February 1997, the Yili Group was formally established and put into production the first production line of Tetra Pak Milk.
In July 2005, the Yogurt Division was established.
In 2008, Yili Group was involved in a food safety scandal, 2008 Chinese milk scandal. The scandal involved melamine-contaminated milk, baby milk powder, and other milk products. The incident causes 13,000 infants to have kidney stones in China and in neighboring countries and regions who consumed the contaminated milk products.
In 2010, the Yili Group officially released the new logos, the brand ideas and the enterprise visions.
In December 2018, the Yili Group was rated as an outstanding private enterprise in Inner Mongolia Autonomous Region.
In 2018, it achieved a total operating income of nearly 80 billion yuan—the best achievement in Asian Dairy Enterprises.
 On 18 March 2019, the group signed an agreement to acquire 100% equity of New Zealand dairy co-operative Westland Milk Products – which was ratified by Westland shareholders on 4 July.

See also
 Chicecream
 Mengniu Dairy

References

External links 
Inner Mongolia Yili Industrial Group Company Limited

Dairy products companies of China
Government-owned companies of China
Companies based in Hohhot
Food and drink companies established in 1993
2008 Chinese milk scandal
Chinese companies established in 1993
Companies listed on the Shanghai Stock Exchange
1996 initial public offerings